Zarat Xeybəri (also, Zarat Xeytəri and Zarat-Kheyberi) is a village in the Shamakhi Rayon of Azerbaijan.  The village forms part of the municipality of Dəmirçi.

References 

Populated places in Shamakhi District